Andrew Ralston may refer to:

 Andrew Patrick Ralston, American actor
 Andrew Thomas Ralston (1880–1950), Scottish amateur footballer and football administrator